Fernando Peres da Silva (8 January 1943 – 10 February 2019), known as Peres, was a Portuguese professional football left winger and manager.

Club career
Peres was born in Algés, Oeiras, Lisbon metropolitan area. He played for C.F. Os Belenenses, Sporting CP, Académica de Coimbra and FC Porto in his country; he experienced his best years with the second club, winning four major titles including two Primeira Liga championships and amassing top-tier totals of 271 games and 87 goals over 13 seasons.

On either side of his spell with Porto, Peres competed in Brazil, winning the 1974 national championship with CR Vasco da Gama and the regional league with Sport Club do Recife. He retired with Treze Futebol Clube at the age of 33, going to have a brief stint as coach; his Portuguese top division experience consisted of 26 matches with U.D. Leiria, and seven with Vitória de Guimarães.

International career
Peres earned 27 caps for Portugal, scoring four goals. His debut came on 4 June 1964 in a 1–1 friendly draw with England where he scored his team's goal, and his last appearance was during the Brazil Independence Cup final against the hosts, on 9 June 1972.

Peres was included in the squad for the 1966 FIFA World Cup, but he did not make any appearances in England.

|}

Death
On 10 February 2019, one month after being admitted in the facility, Peres died at the António Egas Moniz Hospital in Lisbon. He was 76 years old.

Honours
Sporting CP
Primeira Liga: 1965–66, 1969–70
Taça de Portugal: 1970–71, 1972–73

Vasco
Campeonato Brasileiro Série A: 1974

Sport
Campeonato Pernambucano: 1975

Portugal
FIFA World Cup third place: 1966

References

External links

1943 births
2019 deaths
People from Oeiras, Portugal
Sportspeople from Lisbon District
Portuguese footballers
Association football wingers
Primeira Liga players
C.F. Os Belenenses players
Sporting CP footballers
Associação Académica de Coimbra – O.A.F. players
FC Porto players
Campeonato Brasileiro Série A players
CR Vasco da Gama players
Sport Club do Recife players
Treze Futebol Clube players
Portugal youth international footballers
Portugal B international footballers
Portugal international footballers
1966 FIFA World Cup players
Portuguese expatriate footballers
Expatriate footballers in Brazil
Portuguese expatriate sportspeople in Brazil
Portuguese football managers
Primeira Liga managers
Liga Portugal 2 managers
U.D. Leiria managers
Vitória S.C. managers
G.D. Estoril Praia managers
Juventude Sport Clube managers
Atlético Clube de Portugal managers